Amathuxidia, commonly known as the koh-i-noors, is a genus of butterflies in the family Nymphalidae. They are large showy butterflies, brown with blue forewing bands and hindwing "tails". They range from Indochina to Sulawesi.

Species
Amathuxidia amythaon (Doubleday, 1847) – koh-i-noor
Amathuxidia morishitai Chou & Gu, 1994
Amathuxidia plateni (Staudinger, [1887]) – Platen's kohinoor

References

External links
Images representing Amathuxidia at EOL
Images representing Amathuxidia at BOLD

Morphinae
Nymphalidae genera
Taxa named by Otto Staudinger